The XIII Constitutional Government of São Tomé and Príncipe (Portuguese: XIII Governo Constitucional de São Tomé e Príncipe) was a Government of São Tomé and Príncipe. It was established on 22 June 2008.

References

2008 establishments in São Tomé and Príncipe
Cabinets established in 2008
Government of São Tomé and Príncipe